Yuriy Nikolayevich Chervanev (born 15 January 1958) is a retired Soviet hurdler, born in Baranovichi, Byelorussian SSR.

Achievements

References

External links 
 

1958 births
Living people
People from Baranavichy
Belarusian male hurdlers
Soviet male hurdlers
Athletes (track and field) at the 1980 Summer Olympics
Olympic athletes of the Soviet Union
Sportspeople from Brest Region